Multiquai is the sixth compilation album released by British funk/acid jazz band Jamiroquai. The album was released in November 2006, as part of the "Multiply Your Jamiroquai" promotion, which involved the band, computer manufacturer Intel, and British computer retailer PC World. It was one of a selection of prizes issued to winners of a competition, with other prizes including tickets to an exclusive performance, "JK for Hugo", and a day's driving experience with the band. The album is only playable on a computer.

Track listing

References

2006 compilation albums
Jamiroquai compilation albums